Marco Mastrofini (1763–1845) was an Italian priest, philosopher and mathematician.

History of work
In 1834 Mastrofini offered to create for the world an "eternal" calendar, and demonstrated that its invariance can be achieved only by application of special intercalary days that would belong to any week or month. He offered to establish a calendar year of 364 days split into 52 seven-day weeks, and to place the 365th day of each year at the end of December, considering it special or out of week.

He planned one more special day in a leap year, and to place it in the middle of a year, between the last day of June and the first day of July, or following the first special day.

Influence on other calendars
His work significantly influenced the Armelin's calendar and calendar reform proposal by Auguste Comte in 1849.

References
Marco Mastrofini Bio

1763 births
1845 deaths
People from Monte Compatri
19th-century Italian Roman Catholic priests
18th-century Italian mathematicians
19th-century Italian mathematicians